This is a list of episodes of the Canadian  cartoon series Jacob Two-Two.

Series overview

Season 1 (2003)

Season 2 (2004)

Season 3 (2004–05)

Season 4 (2005–06)

Season 5 (2005-06)

References

Jacob Two-Two